Born auf dem Darß is a municipality in the Vorpommern-Rügen district, in Mecklenburg-Western Pomerania, Germany. It is part of the peninsula Darß, to which also belong the villages of Prerow and Wieck. Born is situated at the southern shore of the peninsula Darß at the coastal lagoon (Low German: Bodden), between Wieck and the Baltic seaside resort Ahrenshoop.

Places of interest
Born is said to be the most beautiful village at the Darß since most of the tiny and typical thatched cottages are still there. The people of Born are very proud of their tradition and want to keep it for further generations.

Landscape
The Darß is part of the former islands Fischland, Darß and Zingst. The peninsula is part of the Western Pomerania Lagoon Area National Park. The surrounding of Born is famous for being a resting place for tens of thousands of migrating cranes and geese. Tourism has long been a source of income and been increased after the German reunification, but the Darß is still far from becoming a crowded tourist place.

History
For centuries Born belonged to the Duchy of Pomerania and became Swedish after the Thirty Years War. After the Treaty of Westphalia in 1648 Born became part of Swedish Pomerania until 1815, when Sweden ceded Pomerania to Prussia. Most of the inhabitants were fishermen or sailors at that time.

References

External links
 National park